The Ralph T. Jope Cup is a rowing award presented to the Eastern Association of Rowing Colleges (EARC) in 1963, by the Massachusetts Institute of Technology, and is awarded annually at the Eastern Sprints to the member college whose lightweight crews score the highest total points in the varsity, junior varsity and first freshman races under a scoring formula developed by the EARC coaches.

In 2015, the points from the freshman race were replaced with the third varsity race.

A graduate of MIT in the class of 1928, Ralph T. Jope served as Secretary to the Institute's Advisory Council on Athletics for many years. A long-time supporter of the sport of rowing, Mr. Jope died in 1965.

Harvard University has won the Jope Cup a record 22 times, with Princeton University having 15 wins, and Yale University having 10. The most recent winner is Yale.

Overall Ranking

Winners by year

References

External links
 Eastern Sprints Regatta Results

College rowing in the United States
Rowing trophies and awards